Kajeh may refer to:
 Kajeh, South Khorasan